Nataša Urbančič (November 25, 1945 – June 22, 2011) was a Slovenian athlete. She was born in Celje, Slovenia.

Urbančič represented Yugoslavia at the 1968 and 1972 Summer Olympics in the javelin. She finished 6th and 5th, respectively. She won the bronze medal in javelin at the 1974 European Athletics Championships. Urbančič was named Slovenian Sportswoman of the Year six years in a row, from 1969 to 1974. She continued to throw into Masters athletics age groups, setting the current W55 world record.

References 

1945 births
2011 deaths
Sportspeople from Celje
Slovenian female javelin throwers
Yugoslav female javelin throwers
Athletes (track and field) at the 1968 Summer Olympics
Athletes (track and field) at the 1972 Summer Olympics
Olympic athletes of Yugoslavia
European Athletics Championships medalists